David Lefotu (born March 25, 1992) is an American football offensive lineman who is a free agent. He played college football at University of Hawaii at Manoa and attended Pearl City High School in Pearl City, Hawaii. He has been a member of the Spokane Empire, Tampa Bay Storm and Albany Empire.

College career
Lefotu played for the Hawaii Rainbow Warriors from 2010 to 2014. He was the team's starter his final three and a half years and helped the Rainbow Warriors to 14 wins. He played in 44 games during his career including 24 starts at guard.

Professional career

Spokane Empire
In December 2015, Lefotu signed with the Spokane Empire of the Indoor Football League. Lefotu was named First Team All-IFL Offense as a rookie following the season, helping the Empire to a conference championship and 2016 United Bowl appearance. Lefotu re-signed with the Empire on September 10, 2016.

Tampa Bay Storm
Lefotu was assigned to the Tampa Bay Storm on January 17, 2017. On July 20, 2017, Lefotu was placed on reassignment.

Albany Empire
On March 19, 2018, Lefotu was assigned to the Albany Empire. On March 24, 2018, he was placed on recallable reassignment.

Personal life
Lefotu is the nephew of former Washington Redskins, Kili Lefotu.

References

External links
Hawaii Rainbow Warriors profile

Living people
1992 births
Players of American football from American Samoa
American sportspeople of Samoan descent
American football offensive linemen
Hawaii Rainbow Warriors football players
Spokane Empire players
Tampa Bay Storm players
Albany Empire (AFL) players